Piercy is an unincorporated community in Mendocino County, California.

The first post office at Piercy opened in 1920. The name honors Sam Piercy, who settled there around 1900.

Climate
This region experiences warm (but not hot) and dry summers, with no average monthly temperatures above .  According to the Köppen Climate Classification system, Piercy has a warm-summer Mediterranean climate, abbreviated Csb on climate maps.

Notable events
The town hosted the Jerry Garcia Band a number of times throughout the late 1980s to 1990, captured in the 2019 six-CD release titled Electric on the Eel.

References

Unincorporated communities in California
Unincorporated communities in Mendocino County, California